54P/de Vico–Swift–NEAT is a periodic comet in the Solar System first discovered by Father Francesco de Vico (Rome, Italy) on August 23, 1844. It has become a lost comet several times after its discovery. The comet makes many close approaches to Jupiter. The comet was last observed on 20 December 2009 by Ageo Observatory.

First discovery (1844) 

Independent discoveries were made by Melhop (Hamburg, Germany) on September 6 and by Hamilton Lanphere Smith (Cleveland, Ohio, USA) on September 10.

Paul Laugier and Felix Victor Mauvais calculated an orbit on September 9, 1844, and noted that a similarity existed with comets seen in previous years, by including comet Blanpain of 1819, into their calculations, they came up with an orbital period of between 4.6 and 4.9 years.

Hervé Faye (Paris, France) computed the first elliptical orbit on September 16, 1844, and the orbital period as 5.46 years.

The comet was considered lost as subsequent predicted returns after 1844 were never observed.

Second discovery (1894) 

Edward D. Swift (Echo Mountain, California, USA) rediscovered the comet on November 21, 1894. Adolf Berberich suggested the comet might be the same as de Vico's comet on the basis of the comet's location and direction of motion.

After 1894, the comet was considered lost again after the 1901 and 1907 returns remained unseen.

Third discovery (1965) 

In 1963, Brian G. Marsden used a computer to link the 1844 and 1894 sightings and calculated a favourable return in 1965. The comet was subsequently recovered by Arnold Klemola (Yale-Columbia Southern Observatory, Argentina) on June 30, 1965, at magnitude 17.

In 1968 the comet passed close to Jupiter which increased the perihelion distance and orbital period, the magnitude dropped and the comet was not observed for subsequent predictions, in 1995 it was again considered lost.

Fourth discovery (2002) 

The Near-Earth Asteroid Tracking (NEAT) program rediscovered the comet on October 11, 2002. The LINEAR program (New Mexico) found several prediscovery images from October 4.  It was confirmed as a return of comet 54P/de Vico-Swift by Kenji Muraoka (Kochi, Japan).

2009 apparition 

On August 17, 2009, comet 54P/de Vico–Swift–NEAT was recovered, while 2.3 AU from the Sun.

References

External links 
 Orbital simulation from JPL (Java) / Ephemeris
 54P at Gary W. Kronk's Cometography
 54P at Kazuo Kinoshita's Comets
 54P at Seiichi Yoshida's Comet Catalog

Periodic comets
0054
Comets in 2017

18440823